Monastery of Mor Augin is a Christian monastery located in southeastern Turkey and is 40 kilometers from Nusaybin.

History

The monastery was founded in the first half of the fourth century AD by Saint Awgin, a monk from El Kulzom, Egypt. Mor Augin came with seventy of his disciples to preach Christianity in Mardin Province which was controlled by the Sasanian Empire.

In 1915 Sayfo the monks witnessed the destruction of Syriac villages in the plains below. The monastery was also affected by violence.

References

Christian monasteries in Turkey
Christian monasteries established in the 4th century
Syriac Orthodox monasteries in Turkey
Tur Abdin